The 1982–83 Cleveland Cavaliers season was the 13th season for the team in the National Basketball Association (NBA) and in Cleveland, Ohio.  It involved the team going 23-59 in Ted Stepien's final season as the team's owner.

Draft picks

Roster

Regular season

Season standings

z - clinched division title
y - clinched division title
x - clinched playoff spot

Record vs. opponents

Game log

|-style="background:#fcc;"
| 19 || December 7, 1982 || Atlanta
| L 90–102
|
|
|
| Coliseum at Richfield2,254
| 3–16
|-style="background:#fcc;"
| 23 || December 16, 1982 || @ Atlanta
| L 97–106
|
|
|
| The Omni4,564
| 3–20

|-style="background:#fcc;"
| 45 || February 1, 1983 || @ Atlanta
| L 84–93
|
|
|
| The Omni4,802
| 9–36
|-style="background:#fcc;"
| 47 || February 4, 1983 || Atlanta
| L 81–92
|
|
|
| Coliseum at Richfield2,066
| 9–38

|-style="background:#fcc;"
| 66 || March 18, 1983 || Atlanta
| L 73–97
|
|
|
| Coliseum at Richfield2,461
| 17–49
|-style="background:#fcc;"
| 72 || March 29, 1983 || @ Atlanta
| L 82–95
|
|
|
| The Omni5,064
| 18–54

Player statistics

Player Statistics Citation:

Awards and records

Transactions
October 7, 1982 - Traded a 1986 2nd round draft pick to the Detroit Pistons for Steve Hayes.

October 11, 1982 - Waived Mike Evans.

October 22, 1982 - Waived Michael Wilson.

October 25, 1982 - Traded Brad Branson to the Indiana Pacers for a 1983 2nd round draft pick.

October 28, 1982 - Waived Lowes Moore.

December 6, 1982 - Signed Sam Lacey as a free agent.

December 15, 1982 - Traded Ron Brewer to the Golden State Warriors for World B. Free.

December 20, 1982 - Waived Paul Mokeski.

January 7, 1983 - Waived Dave Magley.

January 10, 1983 - Acquired player rights to Larry Kenon from the Golden State Warriors.

January 14, 1983 - Traded Scott Wedman to the Boston Celtics for Darren Tillis and a 1983 1st round draft pick.

February 7, 1983 - Traded James Edwards and a 1983 1st round draft pick to the Phoenix Suns for Jeff Cook, a 1983 1st round draft pick, and a 1983 3rd round draft pick.

March 21, 1983 - Waived Larry Kenon.

March 30, 1983 - Signed Carl Nicks as a free agent.

June 27, 1983 - Traded a 1983 2nd round draft pick to the Seattle SuperSonics for Lonnie Shelton.

References

Cleveland Cavaliers seasons
C
Cleveland
Cl\eveland